Franklin Burroughs is an American author of nonfiction.

Biography
Burroughs holds a B.A. in English from Sewanee: The University of the South and a Ph.D. from Harvard University.

He is the Harrison King McCann Research Professor of the English Language Emeritus at Bowdoin College.  He retired from teaching in 2002.  He writes primarily about the people and natural environments in and around Conway, South Carolina where he was raised, and Bowdoinham, Maine, where he has lived his adult life.

Awards
National Endowment for the Arts fellowship
"Compression Wood" was anthologized in the 1999 Best American Essays, edited by Edward Hoagland and Robert Atwan.
Confluence: Merrymeeting Bay received the 2009 John Burroughs Medal for natural history writing.

Books
Horry and the Waccamaw
Billy Watson's Croker Sack
Confluence: Merrymeeting Bay

References
http://www.sewanee.edu/ywc/SYWCSGuestBurroughs.htm 
http://www.bowdoin.edu/news/archives/1bowdoincampus/003289.shtml 
http://www.bowdoin.edu/faculty/f/fburroug/

Living people
Sewanee: The University of the South alumni
Harvard University alumni
American essayists
American male essayists
Writers from South Carolina
Writers from Maine
Bowdoin College faculty
People from Bowdoinham, Maine
People from Conway, South Carolina
Year of birth missing (living people)